A surface-to-surface missile (SSM) or ground-to-ground missile (GGM) is a missile designed to be launched from the ground or the sea and strike targets on land or at sea. They may be fired from hand-held or vehicle mounted devices, from fixed installations, or from a ship. They are often powered by a rocket engine or sometimes fired by an explosive charge, since the launching platform is typically stationary or moving slowly. They usually have fins and/or wings for lift and stability, although hyper-velocity or short-ranged missiles may use body lift or fly a ballistic trajectory. The V-1 flying bomb was the first operational surface-to-surface missile.

Contemporary surface-to-surface missiles are usually guided. An unguided surface-to-surface missile is usually referred to as a rocket (for example, an RPG-7 or M72 LAW is an anti-tank rocket whereas a BGM-71 TOW or AT-2 Swatter is an anti-tank guided missile).

Examples of surface-to-surface missile include the MGM-140 ATACMS, the Ground-Launched Small Diameter Bomb (GLSDB) and the Long Range Precision Fires (LRPF).

Examples
MGM-166 LOSAT
MGM-140 ATACMS
PARS 3 LR
Polyphem
ALAS
KARA Atmaca
Hermes
Nimrod
Otomat
Bina
RBS-15
Luz
Kh-35
Kh-58
Lightweight Multirole Missile
Long-Range Hypersonic Weapon (LRHW) 
P-800 Oniks
3M-54 Kalibr
BGM-109 Tomahawk
Hyunmoo-3

Types
Surface-to-surface missiles are usually divided into a number of categories:

Ballistic missiles travel in a high trajectory, motor burns out partway through flight
Tactical ballistic missile: Range between about 150 km and 300 km
Battlefield range ballistic missile (BRBM): Range less than 200 km
Theatre ballistic missile (TBM): range between 300 km and 3500 km
Short-range ballistic missile (SRBM): Range 1000 km or less
Medium-range ballistic missile (MRBM): Range between 1000 km and 3500 km
Intermediate-range ballistic missile (IRBM) or Long-range ballistic missile (LRBM): Range between 3500 km  and 5500 km
Intercontinental ballistic missile (ICBM): Range greater than 5500 km
Submarine-launched ballistic missile (SLBM): Launched from ballistic missile submarines (SSBNs), all current designs have intercontinental range.
 Cruise missiles travel low to the ground, motor burns during entire flight, typical range 2,500 km (1,500 mi)
 Anti-tank guided missiles travel low to the ground, may or may not burn motor throughout flight, typical range 5 km (3 mi)
 Anti-ship missiles travel low over the ground and sea, and often pop up or  before striking the target ship; typical range 130 km (80 mi)

Different parties break down missile type by the range differently. For example, the United States Department of Defense has no definition for LRBM, and thus defines an ICBM as those missiles with ranges greater than 5,500 km (3500 mi). The International Institute for Strategic Studies also does not define a range for LRBMs, and defines SRBMs as having somewhat shorter ranges than the definition used by the Department of Defense.

References 

Missile types